The 1986–87 NCAA Division I men's basketball rankings was made up of two human polls, the AP Poll and the Coaches Poll, in addition to various other preseason polls.

Legend

AP Poll

Coaches Poll

References 

1986-87 NCAA Division I men's basketball rankings
College men's basketball rankings in the United States